Peter Suschitzky, A.S.C. (born 25 July 1941) is a British cinematographer and photographer. Among his most known works as director of photography are The Rocky Horror Picture Show, The Empire Strikes Back, and Mars Attacks! and the later films of David Cronenberg. Suschitzky succeeded Mark Irwin as Cronenberg's regular cinematographer when Irwin left during the pre-production of Dead Ringers (1988), and has been the cinematographer for all of Cronenberg's films since, with the exception of Crimes of the Future (2022). He has also collaborated with directors John Boorman, Ken Russell, Bernard Rose, and Tim Burton.

Suschitzky has been the recipient of four Genie Awards for Best Achievement in Cinematography, and a David di Donatello Award for Best Cinematography. He is featured in the book Conversations with Cinematographers, published by Scarecrow Press. He is married to Ilona Suschitzky.

In 2015 he was selected to be a member of the jury for the International Critics' Week section of the 2015 Cannes Film Festival.

Life and career 
Suschitzky was born in London, England the son of BAFTA Award-nominated cinematographer Wolfgang Suschitzky. His father was an Austrian of Jewish descent. Although music was his passion, he chose to pursue a career in cinematography while studying at Institut des hautes études cinématographiques in Paris, France. He became a clapper boy at age 19 and a camera operator at age 22.

Among his first films as DP was It Happened Here, a mockumentary-style World War II film about life in the United Kingdom, following a hypothetical Axis victory in World War II. The film was shot on handheld, 16mm film in order to give it a gritty, realistic look inspired by wartime newsreels. Due to the film's independent nature and unusual subject matter, its production lasted a total of eight years.

In 1975, Suschitzky shot The Rocky Horror Picture Show, a comedy musical film that, while initially unsuccessful, has since become a massive cult film, with regular midnight screenings attended by dedicated, cosplaying fans. He shot the 1977 biopic Valentino for director Ken Russell, for which he received a nomination for a BAFTA Film Award for Best Cinematography. Three years later, he would lens the second entry in the long-running Star Wars film series, The Empire Strikes Back, considered to be the best in the series.

Suschitzky replaced Mark Irwin as director David Cronenberg's regular director of photography, beginning with the 1988 film Dead Ringers, for which he won a Genie Award for Best Cinematography. He would go on to win three more Genies in his collaborations with Cronenberg on the films Naked Lunch, Crash, and Eastern Promises.

Filmography

Short films

Feature films

Television

References

External links
 

1941 births
Living people
British cinematographers
British Jews
British people of Austrian descent
Best Cinematography Genie and Canadian Screen Award winners